| lowest attendance   = 200 (x3)
| tries               = 
| top point scorer    =  Johnny McPhillipsUlster A 62
| top try scorer      =  Tom WilliamsScarlets PS 8
| venue               = Irish Independent Park
| attendance2         = 
| champions           = Munster A 
| count               = 2
| runner-up           = Jersey Reds
| website             = B&I Cup Website
| previous year       = 2015–16
| previous tournament = 2015–16 British and Irish Cup
| next year           = 2017–18
| next tournament     = 2017–18 British and Irish Cup
}}

The 2016–17 British and Irish Cup was the eighth season of the annual rugby union competition for second tier, semi-professional clubs from Britain and Ireland. London Welsh were the defending champions having won the 2015–16 final against Yorkshire Carnegie 10–33 at Headingley Carnegie Stadium, Leeds on 10 April 2016. There have been six different winners and six different losing finalists in the seven seasons of its existence. The format of the competition is similar to last season with Scottish clubs not competing. For the second consecutive season the four Welsh teams were the reserve sides of the teams competing in the Pro12 competition instead of clubs from the Welsh Premier Division.

Competition format
The competition format is a pool stage followed by a knockout stage. The pool stage consists of five pools of four teams playing home and away matches. The top side in each pool, plus the three best runners-up, progress to the knockout stage. The eight quarter-finalists are ranked, with top four teams having home advantage. The four winning quarter-finalists progress to the semi-final draw. Most of the matches are played on the same weekends as the European Champions Cup and European Challenge Cup. First round matches began on 14 October 2016 and the final was held on the 21 April 2017.

Participating teams and locations
The allocation of teams is as follows:
  – twelve clubs from RFU Championship
  – four Irish provinces represented by 'A' teams
  – four Welsh regions represented by Premiership Select teams.

Pool stages

Pool 1

Round 1

Round 2

Round 3

Round 4

Round 5

Round 6

 Postponed from 21 January due to frozen pitch.

Pool 2
London Welsh entered liquidation on 8 December 2016 and were disqualified from the competition and their results from rounds 1 and 2 annulled.

Round 1

 London Welsh expelled from the competition

Round 2

 London Welsh expelled from the competition.

 Match postponed due to the death of Munster Rugby's head coach Anthony Foley and played on 7 January 2016.

Round 3

Round 4

Round 2 (rescheduled game)

 Match postponed from 22 October 2016.

Round 5

Round 6

Pool 3

Round 1

Round 2

Round 3

Round 4

Round 5

Round 6

Pool 4

Round 1

Round 2

Round 3

Round 4

Round 5

Round 6

Pool 5

Round 1

Round 2

Round 3

Round 4

Round 5

Round 6

Knock-out stage
The eight qualifiers were seeded according to performance in the pool stage. The four top seeds hosted the quarter-finals against the lower seeds, in a 1 v 8, 2 v 7, 3 v 6 and 4 v 5 format. If two teams qualified from the same group they could not be drawn together despite the seeding, therefore, Jersey Reds did not play against Ulster A. The quarter-finals were held over the weekend of 10/11/12 March 2017, the semi-finals were held over the weekend of 31 March and 1 & 2 April 2017 and the final was played on 21/22/23 April 2017.

Teams are ranked by:
1 – competition points (4 for a win, 2 for a draw)
2 – where competition points are equal, greatest number of wins
3 – where the number of wins are equal, aggregate points difference
4 – where the aggregate points difference are equal, greatest number of points scored

Quarter-finals
The draw for the quarter-finals was made on 23 January 2017, with the matches to be played on the weekend of 10–13 March 2017.

Semi-finals

Final

Attendances

Individual statistics
 Points scorers includes tries as well as conversions, penalties and drop goals. Appearance figures also include coming on as substitutes (unused substitutes not included).

Top points scorers

Top try scorers

Season records

Team
Largest home win — 77 points
84 – 7 Ealing Trailfinders at home to Scarlets Premiership Select on 11 March 2017
Largest away win — 49 points
68 – 19 Leinster A away to Richmond on 15 October 2016
Most points scored — 84 points
84 – 7 Ealing Trailfinders at home to Scarlets Premiership Select on 11 March 2017
Most tries in a match — 12
Ealing Trailfinders at home to Scarlets Premiership Select on 11 March 2017
Most conversions in a match — 10
Ealing Trailfinders at home to Scarlets Premiership Select on 11 March 2017
Most penalties in a match — 5
Rotherham Titans at home to Doncaster Knights on 15 October 2016
Most drop goals in a match — 1
Richmond away to Leinster on 20 January 2017

Player
Most points in a match — 26
 Rory Clegg for Ealing Trailfinders at home to Scarlets Premiership Select on 11 March 2017
Most tries in a match — 4
 Rob O'Donnell for Yorkshire Carnegie at home to Bedford Blues on 23 October 2016
Most conversions in a match — 10
 Rory Clegg for Ealing Trailfinders at home to Scarlets Premiership Select on 11 March 2017
Most penalties in a match —  5
 Lloyd Evans for Rotherham Titans at home to Doncaster Knights on 15 October 2016
Most drop goals in a match —  1
 Freddy Gabbitass for Richmond away to Leinster on 20 January 2017

Attendances
Highest — 4,813
Ulster A at home to London Scottish on 13 January 2017
Lowest — 200 (x3)
Ulster A at home to Jersey Reds on 14 October 2016
Connacht Eagles at home to Cornish Pirates on 16 October 2016
Newport Gwent Dragons Premiership Select at home to Ealing Trailfinders on 22 October 2016
Highest Average Attendance — 2,180 (London Irish)

Lowest Average Attendance — 283 Scarlets Premiership Select)

References

External links
  Unofficial British and Irish Cup website - latest news, teams etc

British and Irish Cup
2016–17 rugby union tournaments for clubs
2016–17 RFU Championship
2016–17 in Irish rugby union
2016–17 in Welsh rugby union
2016–17 in British rugby union